James Macandrew (1819(?) – 25 February 1887) was a New Zealand ship-owner and politician. He served as a Member of Parliament from 1853 to 1887 and as the last Superintendent of Otago Province.

Early life
Macandrew was born in Scotland, probably in Aberdeen, where he was baptised on 18 May 1819.

He became active in the Free Church of Scotland, and from there, in the proposed colonisation of Otago (which was being advocated by the Lay Association of the Free Church of Scotland, later the Otago Association). In partnership with his brother-in-law William Reynolds, Macandrew bought a schooner, loaded it with cargo, and set sail for Otago with his family. He arrived in January 1851.

Still working in partnership with his brother-in-law, Macandrew immediately became a major figure in the business community of Dunedin. Reynolds, his brother-in-law, began to build up a shipping business, while Macandrew himself established a trading firm in the city. The partners later established a steamer service between Dunedin and Melbourne, Australia. The two soon became very wealthy.

Political career

Macandrew was one of six representatives for the Dunedin Country electorate in the first Otago Provincial Council (1853–1855). He represented the Central electorate in the second provincial council (1855–1859), and the Port Chalmers electorate in the fourth provincial council (1863–1867). Macandrew was Superintendent of Otago Province from 1860 to 1861, and again from 1867 until abolition in 1876. He was Speaker of Otago Province twice (1853–1854, and 1856–1859). From January to November 1854, he was on the council's executive.

When it was formed, Macandrew was elected to the New Zealand Parliament, representing the Town of Dunedin electorate. In Parliament, he fought what he saw as a bias towards the northern provinces (Auckland and Wellington) at the expense of his own Otago. He also defended the practice of opening Parliament with prayers (describing them as a necessary "acknowledgement of dependence on the Divine Being"), and lobbied that all Parliamentary debates be published.

He remained in Parliament until his death on 24 February 1887, having served in nine separate terms for the electorates. He first served for Town of Dunedin 1853–1858 (he resigned on 2 November 1858). He successfully contested a 14 January 1859 by-election in the same electorate and served until the end of the parliamentary term in 1860. Next, he served in the Bruce electorate 1865–1866, followed by Clutha 1866–1870, Port Chalmers 1871–1875 and City of Dunedin 1875–1879. His last term was in Port Chalmers again from 1879 to 1887, when he died.

He was Minister of Works from 5 March 1878 to 8 October 1879. For his last six and a half years in Parliament, he held the title of Father of the House, as the longest continuously serving MP.

Personal life 
Macandrew and his wife had four daughters and four sons. One son, Dr Herbert Macandrew, became medical superintendent of the Seaview Asylum in Hokitika.

He died as a result of an accident in Dunedin.

Commemoration
The town of Macandrew Bay on the Otago Peninsula is named after James Macandrew, and Dunedin's former main sporting venue, Carisbrook is named after his former home in the city.

Macandrew Road in Port Chalmers is named after him.

Macandrew is buried at Macandrew Bay Cemetery.

Notes

References

|-

1819 births
1887 deaths
Members of the New Zealand House of Representatives
Superintendents of New Zealand provincial councils
Businesspeople from Dunedin
People from Aberdeen
Scottish emigrants to New Zealand
History of Dunedin
Otago Peninsula
New Zealand MPs for Dunedin electorates
Settlers of Otago
New Zealand MPs for South Island electorates
Burials at Macandrew Bay Cemetery
19th-century New Zealand politicians
Members of the Otago Provincial Council